Dromoceryx is a genus of beetles in the family Carabidae, containing the following species:

 Dromoceryx dorsalis Schmidt-Goebel, 1846
 Dromoceryx flavocircumdayus Mateu, 1984
 Dromoceryx magnus Mateu, 1984

References

Lebiinae